Nordi is both a surname and a given name. Notable people with the name include:

Cleo Nordi (1898–1983), Russo-Finnish ballerina
Emanuele Nordi (born 1984), Italian footballer
Nordi Mukiele (born 1997), French footballer